Tazeh Kand-e Poruch (also Romanized as Tāzeh Kand-e Porūch; also known as Tāzeh Kand) is a village in Kandovan Rural District, Kandovan District, Meyaneh County, East Azerbaijan Province, Iran. At the 2006 census, its population was 88, in 18 families.

References 

Populated places in Meyaneh County